Derek Russell Davis FBPsS FRCPsych (20 April 1914 – 3 February 1993) was a British psychiatrist who served as the Norah Cooke-Hurle Professor of Mental Health at Bristol University from 1962 to 1979.

Career
Davis attended the Stowe School before obtaining a medical degree at the School of Clinical Medicine of the University of Cambridge. He completed his residency at Middlesex Hospital, and returned to Cambridge to work at the university hospital. Davis was named reader of clinical psychology in 1950, and began teaching medical psychology in 1958, when he was appointed as  director of the Medical Psychology Laboratory. He left for Bristol University in 1962 and taught there until 1979, as the Norah Cooke-Hurle Professor of Mental Health. Davis wrote for the British Journal of Medical Psychology and was the editor of the Quarterly Journal of Experimental Psychology.

References

1914 births
1993 deaths
British psychiatrists
Fellows of the British Psychological Society
Fellows of the Royal College of Psychiatrists
People educated at Stowe School
Alumni of the University of Cambridge
Academics of the University of Cambridge
Academics of the University of Bristol